Mirbelia ramulosa is a species of flowering plant in the family Fabaceae and is endemic to the south-west of Western Australia. It is an erect, much-branched, spiny, leafless shrub with yellow and red, purple or brown flowers.

Description
The standard petal is twice as long as the sepals, the wings shorter than the standard and the keel shorter than the wings.

Taxonomy
This species was first formally described in 1839 by John Lindley, who gave it the name Daviesia ramulosa in A Sketch of the Vegetation of the Swan River Colony. In 1930, Charles Gardner changed the name to Mirbelia ramulosa in Enumeratio Plantarum Australiae Occidentalis. The specific epithet (ramulosa) means "bearing branchlets".

Distribution and habitat
Mirbelia ramulosa grows on rocky or gravelly hills and ranges and is widely distributed in the south -west of Western Australia and in isolated populations in the south of the Northern Territory.

Conservation status
This species of pea is listed as "not threatened" by the Government of Western Australia Department of Biodiversity, Conservation and Attractions, but as "near threatened" under the Northern Territory Territory Parks and Wildlife Conservation Act.

References

Flora of Western Australia
Flora of the Northern Territory
Plants described in 1839
ramulosa
Taxa named by John Lindley